This is a list of finalists for the 2006 Archibald Prize for portraiture (listed is Artist – Title). 

Catherine Abel – Portrait of Julia Leigh
John Beard – Ken Unsworth
Danelle Bergstrom – Back to front – Kevin Connor
Kate Beynon – Year of the dog self-portrait
Tom Carment – Professor Muecke, portrait of Stephen Muecke
Jun Chen – Joe Furlonger
Peter Churcher – Bruce, Linde and me on the road to Guadelupe
Adam Cullen – Edmund, portrait of Edmund Capon
Geoffrey Dyer – The Abstractionist Graham Fransella
McLean Edwards – Cate Blanchett and family
Prudence Flint – Four wheel drive #2, self-portrait 
Robert Hannaford – Tim Flannery
Nicholas Harding – Robert Drewe (in the swell) 2006
Weaver Jack – Weaver Jack in Lungarung, self-portrait 
Paul Jackson – Garry McDonald "All the world's a stage..." (Winner of the 2006 People's Choice Award)
Jasper Knight – Sir Harold Knight KBE DSC
Kerrie Lester – Phillip Noyce – in the picture
Michael Mucci – A working class man portrait of Scott Cam (Winner of the 2006 Packing Room Prize) 
Paul Newton – Portrait of Pat Corrigan
Josonia Palaitis – Justice Michael Kirby
Rodney Pople – Artist and Curator, after Gainsborough
Ben Quilty – Cullen – before and after
Craig Ruddy – Self-portrait – into the box
Paul Ryan – Nicholas in Nowra, portrait of Nicholas Harding
Jenny Sages – Hossein Valamanesh
Gillie and Marc Schattner – John and his black dog, portrait of John Konrads
Jiawei Shen – This is not a photo, portrait of Greg Weight
Peter Smeeth – Clover Moore with Sheba and Bruno
Kathleen Vafiadis – Julia, portrait of Julia Gillard
Craig Waddell – Portrait of JC, portrait of Jessie Cacchillo
John R. Walker – Martin Armiger
Greg Warburton – Jim Conway
Marcus Wills – The Paul Juraszek Monolith (after Marcus Gheeraerts) (Winner of the Archibald Prize)
Bin Xie – Bright smile, portrait of Lindy Lee
Huihai Xie – A groom, portrait of Liu Yang
Michael Zavros – Michael Zavros can't paint / the wind is whistling through the house, self-portrait

See also 
 Previous year: List of Archibald Prize 2005 finalists
 Next year: List of Archibald Prize 2007 finalists
 List of Archibald Prize winners

External links
Archibald Prize 2006 finalists official website

2006
Archibald
Archibald Prize 2006
Archibald Prize 2006
2006 in art
Arch
Archibald